Audrée Phipps Estey (January 7, 1910 – June 6, 2002), known as "New Jersey's First Lady of Dance",  was an American dancer who founded the Princeton Ballet Society and the American Repertory Ballet.

Biography
Estey was born in Winnipeg, Manitoba, on January 7, 1910, as Audrée Phipps.  She married and had a son, Lawrence M. Estey and a daughter, Carol Estey. In 1954 she founded the Princeton Ballet Society. In 1963 she founded the American Repertory Ballet. She died on June 6, 2002, in Deer Isle, Maine.

References

1910 births
2002 deaths
Dance in New Jersey
Canadian emigrants to the United States